HMS Oroonoko was the French privateer Eugène, which the Royal Navy bought in 1805 to replace the previous Oroonoko as a prison ship at Port-of-Spain, Trinidad. She was sold in 1814.

Eugène may have been the sloop sailing from Bordeaux to New Orleans that  captured early in 1805 and sent into Jamaica.

Citations

References
 

1800s ships
Captured ships
Brigs of the Royal Navy